August "Augie" Lohman (also known as A. J. Lohman) (April 10, 1911 – August 7, 1989) was an American special effects artist who was nominated at the 33rd Academy Awards for Best Special Effects for the film The Last Voyage.

He worked on over 60 films during his career.

References

External links

Special effects people
1911 births
1989 deaths
Artists from Colorado Springs, Colorado